The Men's under-23 road race of the 2017 UCI Road World Championships was a cycling event that took place on 22 September 2017 in Bergen, Norway. It was the 22nd edition of the event, for which Norwegian rider Kristoffer Halvorsen was the defending champion, having won in 2016. The race was won by French rider Benoît Cosnefroy, who outsprinted German rider Lennard Kämna. 178 riders from 56 nations entered the competition.

Qualification
Qualification was based mainly on the UCI Under-23 Continental Rankings by nations as of 12 August 2018, with varying number on qualifications depending on the continent. In addition to this number, any rider within the top placings of the continent's elite tour ranking that was not already qualified, the outgoing World Champion and the current continental champions were also able to take part.

Continental champions

The European champion Casper Pedersen, was not directly eligible, as Denmark had already reached the cap of six qualified riders.

Final classification

References

Men's under-23 road race
UCI Road World Championships – Men's under-23 road race
2017 in men's road cycling